David M. Allen (born 26 June 1953) is an English record producer, engineer and mixer. They are mostly known for their work with new wave, synth-pop and goth rock bands including the Cure, the Sisters of Mercy, the Chameleons, Depeche Mode, the Mission, the Associates, the Human League, Clan of Xymox, Gianna Nannini, Shelleyan Orphan and others. They also produced Neneh Cherry's hit album Them.

They created Blank Multimedia in 1994, which operated from the home of XFM from 1995 to 1997, designed websites for Chrysalis and Rough Trade Records, and made an interactive cross-platform CD+ featuring The Plunge Club with music from Andy M. Wright. Blank also organised a 24-hour Internet art gallery, groundbreaking for the era.

In 2022, for Record Store Day UK, they released a vinyl album, DNA of DMA on the Themsay label. This is an historical artefact from 1980 consisting mainly of solo written and produced tracks. These tracks led to a position of programmer and engineer at Genetic Studios in early 1981. This vinyl album was made record of the week by JunoDaily.

Selected discography (as producer)

Studio albums
The Members – Going West
The Cure – The Top
The Cure – The Head on the Door
The Cure – Kiss Me Kiss Me Kiss Me
The Cure – Disintegration
The Cure – Wish
12 Drummers Drumming – Loveless
The Sisters of Mercy – First and Last and Always
Richard Strange and The Engine Room – Going Gone
The Chameleons – Strange Times
The Chameleons – Why Call It Anything
The Associates – Waiting for the Love Boat
Wire – Manscape
Gianna Nannini – Scandalo
Stefan Eicher – Combien de Temps
Stefan Eicher – My Place
Poems for Laila – La filette triste
Gianna Nannini – X Forza E X Amore
Gianna Nannini – Dispetto
The Damned – Not of This Earth  
Frente – Shape
Feline – Save Your Face
Fra Lippo Lippi – Songs
Neneh Cherry – Man
The Mission – Aura
The Mission – The Brightest Light
David M. Allen – The Genetic Tape
Sennen – Lost Harmony
The Psychedelic Furs – Book of Days

Live albums
The Cure – Concert
Gianna Nannini – Giannissima

Singles
Dead or Alive – "Misty Circles"
Depeche Mode – "It's Called a Heart"
Fra Lippo Lippi – "Shouldn't Have to Be Like That"
Yassassin – "Pretty Face"
Yassassin – "Cherry Pie"
The Cure - "Love Cats"
The Cure - "Friday I'm in Love"
Depeche Mode - "It's Called a Heart"

Remixes
Depeche Mode – "Route 66"
Thomas Leer – "Heartbeat"
The Human League – "Life on Your Own"

Films
The Cure – The Cure in Orange
Conny Plank: The Potential of Noise (2017)

References

External links
David M. Allen Discogs

Living people
English record producers
English audio engineers
English male singers
English songwriters
English rock musicians
English new wave musicians
1953 births
Musicians from Twickenham
British male songwriters